The North Dakota Fighting Hawks baseball team was a part of the athletic program at the University of North Dakota in Grand Forks, North Dakota.

History
The team was a member of the NCAA Division I Western Athletic Conference. It played at Harold Kraft Memorial Field. The last head coach was Jeff Dodson. The public address announcer for the baseball team was Kris Holm.

Announced April 12, 2016, as a part of expense reductions because of institution and statewide budget cuts, the University of North Dakota announced the baseball program would be discontinued at the end of their 2015–16 season.

Head coaches

Stadiums 
 Harold Kraft Memorial Field

References

External links
 

 
1901 establishments in North Dakota
2016 disestablishments in North Dakota
Baseball teams established in 1901
Baseball teams disestablished in 2016